Seafarers' Pensions Convention, 1946 is  an International Labour Organization Convention.

It was established in 1946, with the preamble stating:
Having decided upon the adoption of certain proposals with regard to seafarers' pensions,...

Ratifications
As of 2013, the convention has been ratified by 13 states.

External links
Text.
Ratifications

International Labour Organization conventions
Pensions
Treaties concluded in 1946
Treaties entered into force in 1962
Treaties of Algeria
Treaties of Argentina
Treaties of the People's Republic of Bulgaria
Treaties of Djibouti
Treaties of Egypt
Treaties of the French Fourth Republic
Treaties of Greece
Treaties of Italy
Treaties of Lebanon
Treaties of the Netherlands
Treaties of Norway
Treaties of Panama
Treaties of Peru
Admiralty law treaties
Treaties extended to French Guiana
Treaties extended to Guadeloupe
Treaties extended to Martinique
Treaties extended to Réunion
1946 in labor relations